Thomas Christian Gordon Jr. (July 14, 1915 – May 17, 2003) was born in Richmond, Virginia.   He attended the University of Virginia where he received his Bachelor of Arts degree in 1936 and his LL.B. in 1938.

For a number of years he was associated with the law firm of McGuire, Woods, King, Gordon and Davis.  For 1963–64, he was President of the Virginia Bar Association.  On February 17, 1965, he was sworn in as a justice of the Supreme Court of Appeals of Virginia, having been elected by the General Assembly.  Justice Gordon resigned from the Court on May 31, 1972, and returned to private practice at McGuire, Woods and Battle.

Justices of the Supreme Court of Virginia
Virginia lawyers
1915 births
2003 deaths
20th-century American judges
20th-century American lawyers